Abhay Chhajlani is an Indian journalist and the former Chief Editor of the Indore-based daily, Nai Dunia. He is a former president of the Indian Newspaper Society, a post which he was elected to in 2002. He has also served the society as a member of its executive committee. He has been associated with Blood Donation 365 Days, an initiative promoting blood donation. He is the chairman of Abhay Prashal, a social facility in Indore and has participated in several social forums. The Government of India awarded him the fourth highest civilian honour of the Padma Shri, in 2009, for his contributions to journalism.

Abhay Chhajlani belongs to the founding family of Naidunia and has been chairman Indore Table Tenns Trust, 1994. Member Indian Languages Newspaper Association (president, member executive committee), Indian Newspaper Society (member executive committee, president 2002–2003).

Awards and recognition
 2009: awarded as the fourth highest civilian honor of the Padma Shri in 2009

References

External links 
 

Recipients of the Padma Shri in literature & education
People from Indore district
Indian male journalists
Social workers
Indian editors
Living people
20th-century Indian journalists
Journalists from Madhya Pradesh
Social workers from Madhya Pradesh
1934 births